The Indian spotted eagle (Clanga hastata) is a large bird of prey native to South Asia. Like all typical eagles, it belongs to the family Accipitridae. The typical eagles are often united with the buteos, sea eagles and other more heavyset Accipitridae, but more recently it appears as if they are less distinct from the more slender accipitrine hawks.

Description

The Indian spotted eagle is about 60 cm in length and has a wingspan of 150 cm. It is broad-headed, with the widest mouth of all spotted eagles. This species has a lighter coloration overall compared to its relatives, with a darker iris that makes the eyes appear darker than the plumage (rather than the other way around as in the northern spotted eagles). Adults can be told apart from the greater spotted eagle by its lighter color, darker eyes, and habitat preference. After about three or four months the young birds are glossy brown with the tips of the head and neck feathers being creamy and giving a spotted appearance. The upper tail coverts are light brown with white giving a barred appearance. The median coverts have large creamy spots. After about eighteen months the bird moults and becomes a darker shade and has less spots. Some older juveniles, unlike the lesser and greater species, are not strongly spotted at all, making the common name somewhat misleading, and also lack the creamy buff nape patch of the juvenile lesser spotted eagle.

Distribution and habitat
The Indian spotted eagle is native in Bangladesh, India, Myanmar and Nepal, where it prefers subtropical and tropical dry forests to plantations and arable land. It is vagrant in Pakistan. In Nepal, it is resident and breeding in Chitwan and Bardia National Parks, in Sukla Phanta and Koshi Tappu Wildlife Reserves and in some unprotected areas in the Terai. In India, it is distributed sparingly over the Gangetic plains, in the east up to Manipur, in Madhya Pradesh and southern Orissa, but in the south limited to Kotagiri and Mudumalai, Nilgiris district, Tamil Nadu and Tumakuru, Karnataka.

This species can often be approached quite closely for a large raptor. Unlike the greater spotted eagle, which is a winter visitor to Indian wetlands, this species does not show any special affinity for wetland habitats.

Systematics, taxonomy and evolution

The Indian spotted eagle was earlier considered as the resident of eastern subspecies of the lesser spotted eagle but has proven quite distinct and readily separable by morphological, behavioral, ecological and DNA sequence data. The Indian lineage seems to have diverged around the middle Pliocene, perhaps some 3.6 million years ago, from the common ancestor of the lesser and greater spotted eagles. The "proto-spotted eagle" probably lived in the general region of Afghanistan, being split into a northern and a southern lineage when both glaciers and deserts advanced in Central Asia as the last ice age began.

The spotted eagles as a group although quite distinct from the typical members, were formerly included in the genus Aquila, the "true eagles". They are now placed in their separate genus Clanga.

References

Further reading
 Parry, S.J.; Clark, W.S. & Prakash, V. (2002): On the taxonomic status of the Indian Spotted Eagle Aquila hastata. Ibis 144(4): 665–675.  (HTML abstract)
 Rasmussen, Pamela C. & Anderton, John C. (2005): Birds of South Asia - The Ripley Guide. Lynx Edicions, Barcelona. 
 Väli, Ülo (2006): Mitochondrial DNA sequences support species status for the Indian Spotted Eagle Aquila hastata. Bull. B.O.C. 126(3): 238–242. PDF fulltext

External links

 BirdLife Species Factsheet: Indian spotted eagle

Eagles
Clanga (genus)
Birds of Nepal
Birds of Pakistan
Birds of India
Birds described in 1834
Taxa named by René Lesson